Pteroplius acuminatus is a species of beetle in the family Cerambycidae, and the only species in the genus Pteroplius. It was described by Audinet-Serville in 1835.

References

Pteropliini
Beetles described in 1835